is a Japanese football player. He plays for FC Ryukyu.

Career
Keisuke Tsumita joined J3 League club FC Ryukyu in 2016.

Club statistics
Updated to 22 February 2018.

References

External links
Profile at FC Ryukyu

1993 births
Living people
Komazawa University alumni
Association football people from Chiba Prefecture
Japanese footballers
J3 League players
FC Ryukyu players
Association football goalkeepers